The 2020–21 Northern Illinois Huskies men's basketball team represented Northern Illinois University in the 2020–21 NCAA Division I men's basketball season. The Huskies, led by interim head coach Lamar Chapman, played their home games at the Convocation Center in DeKalb, Illinois as members of the Mid-American Conference. In a season limited due to the ongoing COVID-19 pandemic, the Huskies finished the season 3–16, 2–12 in MAC play to finish in last place. They failed to qualify for the MAC tournament which had been limited to provide that the bottom four finishers would not be eligible. The MAC also announced the removal of divisions in cost-cutting measure partly attributed to COVID-19.

On January 3, 2021, it was announced that head coach Mark Montgomery had been relieved of his duties after the team's 1–7 start to the season. Associate head coach Lamar Chapman was named interim head coach for the remainder of the season.

Previous season
The Huskies finished the 2019–20 season 18–13, 11–7, to finish in a tie for first place in the MAC West division. They were scheduled to play Miami (OH) in the quarterfinals of the MAC tournament, but the remainder of the tournament was cancelled amid the COVID-19 pandemic.

Roster

Schedule and results 

|-
!colspan=12 style=| Regular season

|-

Sources

References

Northern Illinois Huskies men's basketball seasons
Northern Illinois Huskies
Northern Illinois Huskies men's basketball
Northern Illinois Huskies men's basketball